Gymnastics competitions at the 2015 Southeast Asian Games were held in the Bishan Sports Hall, Singapore from 6 to 14 June 2015.

Participating nations
Artistic
66 athletes from eight nations were due to compete in artistic gymnastics:

Rhythmic
28 athletes from 5 nations were due to compete in rhythmic gymnastics:

Competition schedule
The schedule for the gymnastics competitions was:

Medalists

Men's artistic

Women's artistic

Rhythmic

Medal table

References

External links